Chandrathil Gouri Krishnadas Nair is an Indian technocrat, teacher and metallurgical scientist known for his contributions in the field of aeronautical metallurgy. Dr Nair was given the Padma Shri Award by the Government of India for his contributions to science and technology in 2001.

Early years 
C. G. Krishnadas Nair was born in kuttipuzha village in  Ernakulam district of Kerala on 17 August 1941 as the son of Idaprampalli Manakkal Krishnan Namboothiri and Chandrathil Gouriamma. Sarvadikaryakkar Kunjikutti Pillai is his maternal ancestor. He had his early education in Kerala and continued his studies at IIT Madras to pass graduate degree in Metallurgical Engineering in 1964. He obtained master's degree in Mechanical Engineering in 1966 and earned PhD in 1968 from the University of Saskatchewan, Canada.

Career 

C. G. K. Nair started his career as an assistant professor in Regional Engineering College, Suratkal (present KNIT). Later, he worked as visiting faculty at University of Sheffield, UK when he quit teaching career to join Hindustan Aeronautics in the design and development department in 1971. Slowly he rose through the ranks to become the first professional engineer to become MD & Chairman of Hindustan Aeronautics Limited. Nair's efforts at HAL is said to have transformed the company into a globally competent aerospace industry through long-term strategic plan with strong R&D, diversification, export, industry academy interaction and work culture based on ethics and teamwork.

Nair is also credited with efforts that led to the design and development of Advanced Light Helicopter, new Jet trainer and Light Armed Helicopter by HAL. He is considered as the influence behind the design of High Altitude Helicopter, Multi Role Transport Aircraft and many advanced aerospace equipments. In 1991, he founded the Society of Indian Aerospace Technologies and Industries (SIATI) to train and support small and medium enterprises to develop aerospace components indigenously. He served as AICTE-INAE Distinguished Visiting Professor at IIT Chennai for two terms after his retirement from HAL when he was appointed as the Vice Chancellor of MATS University. In 2008, he was invited by Government of Kerala to head Cochin International Airport Limited as the Managing Director. He served CIAL till 2011.

C. G. K. Nair has presented and published 193 scientific papers at various conferences at national and international levels. He has authored 20 books. He is the Chairperson of National Institute of Technology Calicut (NITC) since the end of his tenure at CIAL in 2011 and is also an independent Director at Global Vectra Helicorp.

Positions held 
C. G. K. Nair has held various positions in his career.
 Chancellor of Jain University, Bangalore - India (Current)
 Chairman and Chief Executive Officer of Hindustan Aeronautics Limited.
 Independent Director at Global Vectra Helicorp Limited since 4 May 2012
 Non-Executive Independent Director at Titan Industries Limited since 2 May 2002
 Member - Scientific Advisory Committee to the Cabinet of India
 Member - Enterprise Reform Committee to the Government of Kerala
 Chairman of the Society of Defence Technologists (SODET)
 President of the Society of Indian Aerospace Technologies
 Member of Governing Council of MVJ College of Engineering
 President of Aeronautical Society of India
 President of Indian Institute of Metals
 Vice-Chancellor of MATS University
 Managing Director, Cochin International Airport Limited
 Founder of International Institute for Aerospace Engineering & Management (IIAEM), Bangalore
 Chairman of National Institute of Technology Calicut

Awards and recognition 
Nair received several awards and recognition during his career.
 Outstanding Aerospace Personality Award (2011) for the decade by Indian Aviation for outstanding contributions to the Indian Aerospace Industry
 Centenary of Aviation Award (2010) by Society of Aerospace Studies
 Rajiv Gandhi 60th Birth Anniversary Rastriya Ekta Samman (2008) for contribution to National prosperity, unity and achievements.
 Life Time Contributions and Achievement Award (2007) from Indian National Academy of Engineering (INAE)
 IIM Platinum Award from Indian Institute of Metals (2004)
 National Metallurgist Award (2003) from the Indian Institute of Metals and Ministry of Steel and Mines
 Scope Award for Excellence in Public Sector Management for best Managed Public Sector (HAL) (2003)
 Scope Award for Best Chief Executive and PM's Gold Plaque (2002) Department of Public Enterprises and Ministry of Industries by Vice-President of India
 Padmashri (2001) by the President of India
 Dr.Ambedkar Bharath Shree Award (2001) by Governor of Karnataka
 Gold Cross Award (International) (2001) by COMITE D’HONNEUR du MERITE ET DEVOUEMENT FRANCAIS, France.
 Rashtriya Ratna Award (2001) International Friendship Forum of India
 Swadeshi Science Puraskara (2000)
 National Award for R&D (1998)
 Hon. Fellow & Life Time Achievement Award from Aeronautical Society of India (1997)
 First Distinguished IIT Alumnus Award from IIT: Chennai (1996)
 Omprakash Bhasin Award in Space & Aerospace Application (1996)
 Hindustan Zinc Gold Medal (1993) by Indian Institute of Metals.
 Vasvik Research Award (1992) by Vibidhlaxi Audyogik Samshodhan Vikas Kendra
 FIE Foundation Award (1991) from FIE Foundation, awarded by the Prime Minister of India
 National Award for R&D (1991) by Department of Scientific & Industrial Research
 Indira Gandhi Memorial National Award (1990) for Excellent Chief Executive, by Central Public Sector Employees Federation, Hyderabad
 National Award for Best Employer of Physically Handicapped (1990) by President of India.
 National Energy Award (1990) by the Institute of Indian Foundry men
 National Aeronautical Prize (1990) from Aeronautical Society of India
 National Award for Best Employer of Physically Handicapped (1989) by President of India
 Birla Gold Medal (1988) from Indian Institute of Metals
 Ferroguard Award (1979) from Electro-Chemical Society of India
 Best Young Metallurgist Award (1975) from Ministry of Steel & Mines, Government of India.
 Fellow of Indian Institute of Metals
 Fellow of Institution of Engineers (India)
 Fellow of Indian National Academy of Engineering

References

Further reading

External links 
 Leadership in Jain University
 Global Vectra HeliCorp site
 Profile on India Infoline
 Global Vectra HeliCorp
 Profile on Sify
 News
 Profile on Indian Boards

1941 births
Living people
Recipients of the Padma Shri in science & engineering
Indian technology writers
Indian metallurgists
Engineers from Kerala
Writers from Kerala
20th-century Indian educational theorists
Scientists from Kerala
20th-century Indian engineers
National Institute of Technology Calicut chairpersons